NSC Cycling Team is a former Malaysian UCI Continental cycling team established in 2015.

References

UCI Continental Teams (Asia)
Cycling teams established in 2015
Cycling teams based in Malaysia
2015 establishments in Malaysia
Defunct cycling teams
Cycling teams disestablished in 2016